Waver may refer to:

 Waver, Belgium, Dutch name of the Belgian city of Wavre
 Waver, England, a location in Cumbria, England
 River Waver in Cumbria
 Waver, Netherlands, a village in the Dutch municipality of Ouder-Amstel

See also
 Waiver